In proof theory, a coherent space (also coherence space) is a concept introduced in the semantic study of linear logic.

Let a set C be given. Two subsets S,T ⊆ C are said to be orthogonal, written S ⊥ T, if S ∩ T is ∅ or a singleton. The dual of a family F ⊆ ℘(C) is the family F ⊥ of all subsets S ⊆ C orthogonal to every member of F, i.e., such that S ⊥ T for all T ∈ F. A coherent space F over C is a family of C-subsets for which F = (F ⊥) ⊥.

In Proofs and Types coherent spaces are called coherence spaces. A footnote explains that although in the French original they were espaces cohérents, the coherence space translation was used because spectral spaces are sometimes called coherent spaces.

Definitions 
As defined by Jean-Yves Girard, a coherence space  is a collection of sets satisfying down-closure and binary completeness in the following sense:

 Down-closure: all subsets of a set in  remain in : 

Coherence spaces correspond one-to-one with (undirected) graphs (in the sense of a bijection from the set of coherence spaces to that of undirected graphs).

Coherence spaces as types 
Coherence spaces can act as an interpretation for types in type theory where points of a type  are points of the coherence space . This allows for some structure to be discussed on types. For instance, each term  of a type  can be given a set of finite approximations  which is in fact, a directed set with the subset relation.

Stable functions 
Functions between types  are seen as stable functions between coherence spaces. A stable function is defined to be one which respects approximants and satisfies a certain stability axiom. Formally,  is a stable function when

 It is monotone with respect to the subset order (respects approximation, categorically, is a functor over the poset ): 
 It is stable:  Categorically, this means that it preserves the pullback:

Product space 
In order to be considered stable, functions of two arguments must satisfy the criterion 3 above in this form: which would mean that in addition to stability in each argument alone, the pullback

is preserved with stable functions of two arguments. This leads to the definition of a product space  which makes a bijection between stable binary functions (functions of two arguments) and stable unary functions (one argument) over the product space. The product coherence space is a product in the categorical sense i.e. it satisfies the universal property for products. It is defined by the equations:

 Tokens from differents sets are always coherent and tokens from the same set are coherent exactly when they are coherent in that set.

References
.
.

Mathematical logic